The Coats Baronetcy, of Auchendrane in the parish of Maybole in the County of Ayr, is a title in the Baronetage of the United Kingdom. It was created on 7 December 1905 for James Coats, Director of J. and P. Coats Ltd, sewing cotton manufacturers. The second Baronet represented Wimbledon and East Surrey in the House of Commons as a Conservative.

The first Baronet was a first cousin of Sir Thomas Glen-Coats, 1st Baronet, and George Coats, 1st Baron Glentanar.

Coats baronets, of Auchendrane (1905)

Sir James Coats, 1st Baronet (1834–1913)
Sir Stuart Auchincloss Coats, 2nd Baronet (1868–1959)
Sir James Stuart Coats, 3rd Baronet (1894–1966)
Sir Alastair Francis Stuart Coats, 4th Baronet (1921–2015)
Sir Alexander James Coats, 5th Baronet (born 1951)

See also
Glen-Coats baronets
Baron Glentanar

References

Kidd, Charles, Williamson, David (editors). Debrett's Peerage and Baronetage (1990 edition). New York: St Martin's Press, 1990.

Coats